KPKY (94.9 FM, "Classic Rock 94.9 & 104.5 The Pick") is a commercial radio station located in Pocatello, Idaho.  KPKY airs a classic rock music format.

Ownership
In October 2007, a deal was reached for KPKY to be acquired by GAP Broadcasting II LLC (Samuel Weller, president) from Clear Channel Communications as part of a 57 station deal with a total reported sale price of $74.78 million.  What eventually became GapWest Broadcasting was folded into Townsquare Media on August 13, 2010; Townsquare, in turn, sold its Idaho Falls–Pocatello stations to Rich Broadcasting in 2011.

History
Through the later 1980s, KPKY was branded as “95 Alive”    and then changed to “Oldies 94.9” by 1993.  , the station became simply known as “94 Nine” with Classic Rock.

Previous logo

References

External links
Official website
Flash Stream
m3u Stream

PKY
Classic rock radio stations in the United States
Radio stations established in 1975
1975 establishments in Idaho